Tassie Cameron is a Gemini Award-winning Canadian screenwriter who has contributed to numerous television shows and films. She was the head writer and executive producer on the Global Television Network/ABC series Rookie Blue and creator of CBC Television and IMDb TV's Pretty Hard Cases.

Early life and education 
Tassie Cameron is the daughter of journalist Stevie Cameron. She spent her formative years at Elmwood School an all-girls school in Rockcliffe Park, Ottawa.

Cameron has a Bachelor's degree in English from the University of Trinity College of the University of Toronto, Master's degree in film from New York University, and is a graduate of the Canadian Film Centre in Toronto.

Career 
Cameron was a story editor and writer on the CTV/Much (TV channel)/MTV Canada and The N/TeenNick teen drama series Degrassi: The Next Generation; an executive story editor and writer for two seasons of CTV's prime-time drama The Eleventh Hour (for which she co-won the Gemini for Best Writing with Semi Chellas); and a writer and story editor on CBC TV and Sony Pictures TV's Tom Stone television series.  In 2007, she adapted Margaret Atwood's The Robber Bride into a television movie.  Cameron also co-wrote with Esta Spalding the acclaimed CTV mini-series Would Be Kings, garnering them a Gemini nomination. She spent eight years in New York City working in independent film and at HBO television and has also worked as a screenwriting instructor at the Humber School for Writers.

References

External links 
 

Canadian television producers
Canadian women television producers
Canadian television writers
Humber College alumni
Living people
Tisch School of the Arts alumni
Year of birth missing (living people)
York University alumni
Canadian women television writers
Place of birth missing (living people)
Canadian women screenwriters
Canadian Film Centre alumni
21st-century Canadian screenwriters
21st-century Canadian women writers